The Lakeview Drive (also known as North Shore Road and the Road to Nowhere) is a  road, split in two segments, located along the north shore of Fontana Lake, wholly within the Great Smoky Mountains National Park.  The scenic road, which was never completed, features an unused road tunnel and connects to various hiking and horse riding trails in the area.

Route description

Lakeview Drive West is the shorter  road segment; located at Fontana Dam, the road hugs the north-western shore of  Little Tennessee River section of Fontana Lake before ending at a parking area.  Both the Appalachian Trail and Benton MacKaye Trail overlap this road segment.

Stone facades on bridges and wooden rails along it shoulders appears similar to the Blue Ridge Parkway.

Lakeshore Trail connects both segments of Lakeview Drive by following the proposed routing of the road.  The  trail includes the half-mile portion of road and tunnel that was never opened for vehicles. The Lakeshore Trail connects with other trails that cross-cross the Great Smoky Mountains National Park and has several campsites.  Some portions of the trail follow old NC 288, where hikers may see abandoned automobiles from 1920's-1930's and a bridge at Lands Creek during the winter months, when lake levels are low.

History

The story of Lakeview Drive begins on July 30, 1943, when the Tennessee Valley Authority (TVA), the state of North Carolina, Swain County and the Department of the Interior (DOI) entered into an agreement that called for:
 TVA to pay $400,000 to the county as compensation for the flooding of North Carolina Highway 288.
 DOI, contingent upon appropriation of all necessary funds, to build a replacement park road around the north side of Fontana Lake.
In 1944, Fontana Dam was completed and Fontana Lake was formed; also by this time, the TVA had fulfilled all its obligations under the agreement.  After World War II, construction began on the western  segment, completed in 1948.  In 1958, North Carolina completed work on Fontana Road (SR 1364), which ends at the National Park boundary.  In 1960, construction began on the eastern segment, where crews quickly ran into unstable rock.  In 1962, after the first  was nearly completed, a letter from the Bureau of Public Roads asked Conrad L. Wirth, then director of the NPS, to "seriously reconsider" the plan and said that the road would become costly with damage to the area's landscape.  Construction was halted by 1971, after the completion of the road tunnel and Noland Creek bridge.  After $4.1 million spent on the road, environmental concerns became a pressing matter because of exposed Anakeesta rock and the possibility that the mild acid that comes from the rock could leak into nearby streams, damaging plants and fish.

Without the road, starting in the late 1970s, the National Park Service began providing transportation to families to visit cemeteries to which access was cut off. A pontoon boat, provided by the Park Service, must cross Fontana Lake. The families started the North Shore Cemetery Association and continue to make occasional visits for "decoration days" on which the families clean up the cemeteries and hold services.

In 1983, a lawsuit brought by a group of Swain County residents to force the NPS to resume construction ended when the Court of Appeals for the 4th Circuit concluded that the 1943 agreement to construct the road had not been breached by DOI as Congress had not appropriated funds for the completion of the road.  The court also held that DOI was under no obligation to seek further appropriations for the completion of the road.

Things remained idle until 2001, when NC Representative Charles H. Taylor inserted $16 million into the Federal Highway Administration appropriation to resume work on the road.  An Environmental impact statement (EIS) was soon performed to evaluate a range of alternatives that could resolve the DOI's obligations under the 1943 agreement.  The EIS resulted in a NPS Record of Decision (ROD) on December 28, 2007 that payment of a monetary settlement to Swain County, in lieu of further construction, was the alternative that would best protect the resources of the park.  Negotiations soon followed, which were aided by NC Representative Heath Shuler and TN Senator Lamar Alexander.

On February 6, 2010, all signatories met in Bryson City and executed a new agreement that explicitly extinguished the 1943 agreement.  It called for a cash settlement of $52 million, paid to Swain County, by on or before December 31, 2020.  Upon complete settlement, all remaining obligations that remain are considered fulfilled.

Swain County had received $12.8 million so far and used interest on that money for county needs. In April 2016, Swain County commissioners filed a lawsuit against the federal government asking for the remaining $29.2 million still owed to the county. The federal government takes the position that the agreement does not require payment until 2020.

On April 24, 2017, Judge Lydia Kay Griggsby of the U.S. Court of Federal Claims dismissed the lawsuit but the county has asked for reconsideration.

Interior Secretary Ryan Zinke released $4 million on September 7, 2017.  The final installment of $35.2 million was paid on June 29, 2018.  However, under the 2010 agreement, the money was deposited with the state treasurer's office. Swain County can spend only the interest the money earns.

Junction list

See also

 Blue Ridge Parkway
 Cherohala Skyway
 Foothills Parkway
 Gatlinburg Bypass
 Newfound Gap Road

References

External links

 
 Great Smoky Mountains National Park

Great Smoky Mountains National Park
Transportation in Swain County, North Carolina
Protected areas of Swain County, North Carolina
Roads in North Carolina